Union Basket Chartres Métropole, commonly known as UB Chartres Métropole or UBCM, is a basketball club that is based in the city of Chartres, France. The club currently plays in the Nationale Masculine 1 (NM1), the third tier of French basketball.

History
UBCM reached the National 3 in 2005 and spent five seasons there before reaching the NM2 where there is only a season by succeeding in realizing two rises in two years. Indeed, the club ends on the first place of one of four groups of this division. Following playoffs, the club ends finally third of National 2 and obtains its entry to the NM1, the third tier of French basketball.

Honours
Nationale Masculine 2
Winners (2): 2009–10, 2010–11
Nationale Masculine 3
Winners (2): 2008–09, 2009–10

References

External links
Official website 

Basketball teams in France
Chartres